Nodaway Township may refer to:

 Nodaway Township, Adams County, Iowa
 Nodaway Township, Page County, Iowa
 Nodaway Township, Taylor County, Iowa
 Nodaway Township, Andrew County, Missouri
 Nodaway Township, Holt County, Missouri
 Nodaway Township, Nodaway County, Missouri

Township name disambiguation pages